Ṣubḥ-i-Azal (1831–1912, born Mírzá Yaḥyá) was an Iranian religious leader of Azali Bábism, known for his conflict with his half-brother Baháʼu'lláh over leadership of the Bábí community after 1853. 

In 1850, when he was just 19 years old, he was appointed by the Báb to lead the Bábí community. When a pogrom began against the Bábís in 1852, Subh-i-Azal fled for Baghdad and spent 10 years there before joining the group of Bábí exiles that were called to Istanbul. During the time in Baghdad tensions grew with Baháʼu'lláh, as Bábí pilgrims began to turn to him for leadership. The Ottoman government further exiled the group to Edirne, where Baháʼu'lláh's announcement of divine revelation turned the tension into an open conflict, which culminated in a public debate that Subh-i-Azal failed to show up to, and an attempt by Subh-i-Azal to poison Baháʼu'lláh. 

In 1868 the Ottoman government further exiled Subh-i-Azal and his followers to Cyprus, and Baháʼu'lláh and his followers to Akko. When Cyprus was leased to Britain in 1878, he lived out the rest of his life in obscurity on a British pension, while interacting with many of the island's Sufis. 

After Azal's death in 1912, the Azali form of Babism entered a stagnation and has not recovered as there is no acknowledged leader or central organization. Most Bábís either accepted the claim of Baháʼu'lláh or the community gradually diminished as children and grandchildren turned back to Islam, By 1904, Azal's followers had dwindled to a small minority, and Baháʼu'lláh was almost universally recognized as the spiritual successor of the Báb. A source in 2001 estimated no more than a few thousand, almost entirely in Iran. Another source in 2009 noted a very small number of followers remained in Uzbekistan.

Name and title
His most widely known title, "Subh-i-Azal"(Morning of Eternity) appears in an Islamic tradition called the Hadith-i-Kumayl (Kumayl was a student of the first Imam, Ali) which the Báb quotes in his book Dalá'il-i-Sab'ih.

It was common practice among the Bábís to receive titles. The Báb's Will and Testament addresses Mirza Yahya in the first verse:
"Name of Azal, testify that there is no God but I, the dearest beloved."

Manuchehri (2004) notes that Mirza Yahya was the only Bábí with such a title as "Azal".

He was titled by the Báb as Subh-i-Azal, that is "Morning of the Eternal" or Hazrat, that is "Highness of the Eternal" or Ismu-l-Azal, that is "Name of the Eternal". There are also references to the titles al-Waḥīd, Ṭalʻat an-Nūr, and at-Tamara.

Life

Early life
Subh-i-Azal was born in 1831 to Kuchak Khanum-i-Karmanshahi and Mírzá Buzurg-i-Núrí, in the province of Mazandaran, and a younger-half-brother of Baháʼu'lláh. His father was a minister in the court of Fath-Ali Shah Qajar. His mother died while giving birth to him, and his father died in 1834 when he was three years old. His father is buried at Vadi-al-Islam in Najaf. He was orphaned at a very young age and taken into the care of his stepmother, Khadíjih Khánum, the mother of Baháʼu'lláh.

Becoming a Bábí
In 1845, at about the age of 14, Subh-i-Azal became a follower of the Báb.

Early activities in the Bábí community
Subh-i-Azal met Tahirih, the 17th Letter of the Living who had, upon leaving the Conference of Badasht, traveled to Nur to propagate the faith. Shortly thereafter, she arrived at Barfurush and met Subh-i-Azal and became acquainted once again with Quddús who instructed her to take Subh-i-Azal with her to Nur. Subh-i-Azal remained in Nur for three days, during which he propagated the new faith. 

During the Battle of Fort Tabarsi, Subh-i-Azal, along with Baháʼu'lláh and Mirza Zayn al-Abedin endeavoured to travel there to assist the soldiers. However, they were arrested several kilometers from Amul. Their imprisonment was ordered by the governor, but Subh-i-Azal escaped the officials for a short while, after which he was discovered by a villager and then brought to Amul on foot with his hands tied. On the path to Amul he was subject to harassment, and people are reported to have spat at him. Upon arriving he was reunited with the other prisoners. The prisoners were ordered to be beaten, but when it came time that Subh-i-Azal should suffer the punishment, Baha'u'llah objected and offered to take the beating in his place. After some time, the governor wrote to Abbas Quli Khan who was commander of the government forces stationed near Fort Tabarsi. Khan replied back to the governor's correspondence, saying that the prisoners were of distinguished families and should not be harassed. Thus, the prisoners were released and sent to Nur upon orders of the commander.

Appointment as the Báb's successor

According to Baháʼí sources, shortly before the Báb's execution, one of the Báb's scribes, Mullā Abdu'l-Karīm Qazvīnī, brought to the Báb's attention the necessity to appoint a successor; thus the Báb wrote a certain number of tablets which he gave to Mullā Abdu'l-Karīm to deliver to Subh-i-Azal and Baháʼu'lláh. These tablets were later interpreted by both Azalis and Baháʼís as proof of the Báb's delegation of leadership. ʻAbdu'l-Bahá states that the Báb did this at the suggestion of Baháʼu'lláh.

In an Azali history, Nuqtat'ul-Kāf, Hājjī Mirzā Jāni Kāshānī (d. 1852) states that after the death of Quddus, the Bab received letters from Subh-i-Azal and was inspired to write a testament nominating him as his successor.

The French diplomat and scholar A.-L.-M. Nicolas maintains that Subh-i-Azal's claim to successorship is obvious;. The Baháʼís hold that the Báb, for the purposes of secrecy, when corresponding with Baháʼu'lláh would address the letters to Subh-i-Azal. After the Báb's death Subh-i-Azal came to be regarded as the central authority in the movement to whom the majority of Bábís turned as a source of guidance and revelation.

During the time that both Baháʼu'lláh and Subh-i-Azal were in Baghdad, Baháʼu'lláh publicly and in his letters pointed to Subh-i-Azal as the leader of the community. However, since Subh-i-Azal remained in hiding, Baháʼu'lláh performed much of the daily administration of the Bábí affairs. Then, in 1863 Baháʼu'lláh made a claim to be Him Whom God Shall Make Manifest, the messianic figure in the Báb's writings, to a small number of followers, and in 1866 he made the claim public. Baháʼu'lláh's claims threatened Subh-i-Azal's position as leader of the religion since it would mean little to be leader of the Bábís if "Him Whom God Shall Make Manifest" were to appear and start a new religion. Subh-i-Azal responded to these claims with severe criticism, but his attempt to preserve the traditional Bábísm was largely unpopular, and his followers became the minority.

Subh-i-Azal's leadership was controversial. He generally absented himself from the Bábí community spending his time in Baghdad in hiding and disguise. Subh-i-Azal gradually alienated himself from a large proportion of the Bábís who started to give their alliance to other claimants. Manuchehri states that Subh-i-Azal remained in hiding because he was primarily concerned with personal safety, due to a statement from the Báb in his will and testament that Subh-i-Azal should protect himself.

MacEoin further states:
Baháʼí polemic has made much capital out of Azal's behaviour at this period, attributing it to a mixture of incompetence and cowardice. But it is clear that he actually continued to identify himself as the head of the Bábís, to write books, reply to letters, and on occasion meet with other leaders of the community His behaviour seems, therefore, to have been dictated less by cowardice than by the adoption of a policy of taqiyya [dissimulation]. Not only was this an approved practice in Shiʻism, but there was particular sanction for it in the seclusionist policies of the last Imams and, in particular, the original ghayba [Occultation] of the Twelfth Imam, who went into hiding out of fear of his enemies.

Baghdad
In 1852, Subh-i-Azal was involved in an uprising in Takur, Iran, which was planned to coincide with the assassination attempt on the life of the Shah. Following the attempt, he and other Babis chose to go into exile in Baghdad. In Baghdad he lived as the generally acknowledged head of the community, but he kept his whereabouts secret from most of the community, instead keeping in contact with the Babis through agents, termed "witnesses", in Iran and Iraq to routinize the charismatic authority of the movement, and echoing "the supposed appointment of agents by the twelfth Imam during the lesser occultation." One of the most important "witnesses of the Bayán" who represented Subh-i-Azal in Baghdad was Sayyid Muhammad Isfahani. Apart from Isfahani, Subh-i-Azal had written to six other individuals naming them all "witnesses of the Bayán." These witnesses are as follows: Mulla Muhammad Ja'far Naraqi, Mulla Muhammad Taqi, Haji Sayyid Muhammad (Isfahani), Haji Sayyid Jawad (al-Karbala'i), Mirza Muhammad Husayn Mutawalli-bashi Qummi, and Mulla Rajab 'Ali Qahir.

Challenges to Baháʼu'lláh's authority
In 1863 Bahá’u’lláh made a claim to be Him Whom God Shall Make Manifest, the messianic figure in the Báb's writings, to a small number of followers, and in 1866 he made the claim public. Bahá’u’lláh's claims threatened Subh-i-Azal's position as leader of the religion since it would mean little to be leader of the Bábís if "Him Whom God Shall Make Manifest" were to appear and start a new religion. Subhh-i-Azal responded by making his own claims, but his attempt to preserve the traditional Bábísm was largely unpopular, and his followers became the minority.

Dayyán
The most serious challenge to the authority of Subh-i-Azal came from Mirza Asad Allah Khu'i "Dayyán," whose activities incited him to write a lengthy refutation titled "Mustayqiz." The Hasht Bihisht refers to Dayyán as "the Judas Iscariot of his people." Following the Báb's death, Dayyán, who had a deep interest in the study of the occult in regards to such areas as alchemy and gematria, began to advance his own claims to be Him Whom God shall make manifest. MacEoin reports that Mirza Muhammad Mazandarani, a follower of Subh-i-Azal, murdered Dayyan for his claims in response to an order by Subh-i-Azal for him to be killed.

Exile

In 1863 most of the Babis were exiled by the Ottoman authorities to Adrianople.
In Adrianople, Baháʼu'lláh made his claim to be the messianic figure of the Bayan public, and created a permanent schism between the two brothers. Subh-i-Azal responded to these claims by making his own claims and resisting the changes of doctrine which were introduced by Baháʼu'lláh. His attempts to keep the traditional Babism were, however, mostly unpopular. During this time there was feuding between the two groups.

According to Balyuzi and some other sources, Subh-i-Azal was behind several murders and attempted murders of his enemies, including the poisoning of Baháʼu'lláh. Some Azali sources re-apply these allegations to Baháʼu'lláh, even claiming that he poisoned himself while trying to poison Subh-i-Azal. The second attempt in 1864 was more severe and had adverse effects on Bahaʼu'lláh throughout the remainder of his life until 1892. Mírzá Yahyá invited Baháʼu'lláh to a feast and shared a dish, half of which was laced with poison. Baháʼu'lláh was ill for 21 days following this attempt and was left with a shaking hand for the rest of his life.

Finally the feuding between the two groups lead the Ottoman government to further exile the two groups in 1868; Baháʼu'lláh and the Baha'is were sent to Akko and Subh-i Azal and his family, along with some followers, were sent to Famagusta in Cyprus.

Family
According to Browne, Mirza Yahya had several wives, and at least nine sons and five daughters. His sons included: Nurullah, Hadi, Ahmad, Abdul Ali, Rizwan Ali, and four others. Rizvan Ali reports that he had eleven or twelve wives. Later research reports that he had up to seventeen wives including four in Iran and at least five in Baghdad, although it is not clear how many, if any, were simultaneous. According to Azali sources, Subh-i-Azal had five wives in total.

He was the grandfather of Roshanak No'doost.

Succession
There are conflicting reports as to whom Subh-i-Azal appointed as his successor. Browne reports that there was confusion over who was to be Subh-i-Azal's successor at his death. Subh-i-Azal's son, Rizwán ʻAli, reported that he had appointed the son of Aqa Mirza Muhammad Hadi Daulatabadi as his successor; while another, H.C. Lukach's, states that Mirza Yahya had said that whichever of his sons "resembled him the most" would be the successor. None appear to have stepped forward. MacEoin reports that Subh-i-Azal appointed his son, Yahya Dawlatabadi, as his successor, but notes that there is little evidence that Yahya Dawlatabadi was involved in the affairs of the religion, and that instead he spent his time as that of secular reformer. Shoghi Effendi reports that Mirza Yahya appointed a distinguished Bábí, Aqa Mirza Muhammad Hadi of Daulatabad (Mirza Hadiy-i-Dawlat-Abadi) successor, but he later publicly recanted his faith in the Báb and in Mirza Yahya. Mirza Yahya's eldest son apparently became a Baháʼí himself. Miller quoting a later source states that Yahya did not name a successor. Miller relied heavily on Jalal Azal who disputed the appointment of Muhammad Hadi Daulatabadi.

MacEoin notes that after the deaths of those Azali Babis who were active in the Constitutional Revolution in Iran, the Azali form of Babism entered a stagnation which it has not recovered as there is no acknowledged leader or central organization. Current estimates are that there are no more than a few thousand.

Works

Large collections of Subh-i-Azal's works are found in the British Museum Library Oriental Collection, London; in the Browne Collection at Cambridge University; at the Bibliothèque Nationale in Paris; and at Princeton University. Some of his works are provided at bayanic.com. In the English introduction to "Personal Reminiscences of the Babi Insurrection at Zanjan in 1850," E.G. Browne lists thirty-eight titles as being among the works of Subh-i-Azal. Browne lists them as follows:

1) Kitab-i Divan al-Azal bar Nahj-i Ruh-i Ayat 
2) Kitab-i Nur 
3) Kitab-i ʻAliyyin
4) Kitab-i Lamʻat al-Azal 
5) Kitab-i Hayat 
6) Kitab-i Jamʻ 
7) Kitab-i Quds-i Azal
8) Kitab-i Avval va Thani 
9) Kitab-i Mirʼat al-Bayan 
10) Kitab-i Ihtizaz al-Quds 
11) Kitab-i Tadliʻ al-Uns 
12) Kitab-i Naghmat ar-Ruh 
13) Kitab-i Bahhaj 
14) Kitab-i Hayakil
15) Kitab fi Tadrib ʻadd huwa bi'smi ʻAli 
16) Kitab-i Mustayqiz 
17) Kitab-i Laʼali va Mujali 
18) Kitab-i Athar-i Azaliyyih 
19) Sahifih-ʼi Qadariyyah 
20) Sahifih-ʼi Abhajiyyih 
21) Sahifih-ʼi Ha'iyyih 
22) Sahifih-ʼi Vaviyyih 
23) Sahifih-ʼi Azaliyyih 
24) Sahifih-ʼi Huʼiyyih 
25) Sahifih-ʼi Anzaʻiyyih 
26) Sahifih-ʼi Huviyyih 
27) Sahifih-ʼi Marathi
28) Alvah-i Nazilih la tuʻadd va la tuhsa 
29) Suʼalat va Javabat-i bi Hisab
30) Tafsir-i-Surih-i-Rum 
31) Kitab-i Ziyarat 
32) Sharh-i Qasidih 
33) Kitab al-Akbar fi Tafsir adh-Dhikr
34) Baqiyyih-ʼi Ahkam-i Bayan 
35) Divan-i Ashʻar-i ʻArabi va Farsi
36) Divan-i Ashʻar-i ʻArabi 
37) Kitab-i Tuba (Farsi) 
38) Kitab-i Bismi'llah

Notes

Sources

1831 births
1912 deaths
Iranian religious leaders
Bábís
Iranian exiles
People from Nur, Iran
Iranian emigrants to the Ottoman Empire
19th-century Iranian people
20th-century Iranian people